Craig Philip Bierko (born August 18, 1964) is an American actor and singer.

Early life
Bierko was born in Rye Brook, New York where his mother Pat ran The Harrison Players, a local community theatre.

After graduating Blind Brook High School, Bierko spent his freshman year studying journalism at Boston University’s School of Public Communications. But he spent most of his time across the Charles River doing plays at Harvard. The following year Bierko transferred to Northwestern University to study acting alongside David Schwimmer, Stephen Colbert, George Newbern and Harry Lennox. He graduated in 1986 with a BS in theater arts from the School of Speech.

Career

Television and film 
Bierko’s film roles include Timothy in the 1996 action film The Long Kiss Goodnight which he credits for being cast in far more interesting, darkly humorous roles such as Max Baer in Ron Howard’s Cinderella Man opposite Russell Crowe, Tom Ryan in Scary Movie 4 (spoofing Tom Cruise throughout the film), Fear and Loathing in Las Vegas, and The Thirteenth Floor. In 2000 Bierko made his Broadway debut as Professor Harold Hill in Susan Stroman’s critically acclaimed revival of Meredith Willson’s The Music Man. Bierko was the original choice for the character of Chandler Bing on the sitcom Friends but turned it down. He played “the jazz guy” Ray King, a love interest for Carrie Bradshaw (Sarah Jessica Parker) in the fourth season of Sex and the City, attorney Jeffrey Coho on season three of the ABC television series Boston Legal, and one of four newly divorced friends on Fox’s short-lived Unhitched. Bierko was cast as Dave Lister in the pilot for the American TV version of the British show Red Dwarf. He has appeared twice on TV's Law & Order: Special Victims Unit - first as Andy Eckerson, a United States Deputy Marshal who is working with the SVU (and ex-flame Det. Olivia Benson) to recapture an escaped convict. and several years later, a serial rapist.

Bierko appeared for four seasons in the Peabody Award-winning series UnREAL as Chet Wilton, the eccentric, drug addicted, womanizing creator of a reality dating show. Recently, he appeared on The Blacklist as The Chairman, the coldly sociopathic head of an underground stock market for criminals and will be seen on season two of the hit Netflix show Sex/Life as a superstar literary agent.

Theater roles 
Bierko was slated to appear on Broadway in the Manhattan Theatre Club production of To Be or Not to Be but withdrew from the production August 29, 2008 for creative differences. He starred as Sky Masterson in the Broadway revival of Guys and Dolls which began performances at the Nederlander Theatre on February 5, 2009, and officially opened on March 1, 2009. It closed on June 14, 2009 after 113 performances. He performed the role of Peter in the acclaimed 2011 New York Philharmonic production of Stephen Sondheim's Company with Neil Patrick Harris, Patti Lupone and Stephen Colbert.

Bierko replaced Bertie Carvel as Miss Trunchbull in Matilda the Musical at the Shubert Theatre along with Jill Paice as Miss Honey on September 3, 2013 but could not start performances until September 17 following a neck and shoulder injury he suffered rehearsing a gymnastic flip. Despite the injury Bierko continued rehearsing, eventually performing the role for about a month  before the shoulder injury - along with a foot injury sustained during performance - made it impractical to continue.

In 2022, Conor McPherson cast Bierko as Mr. Burke in his Girl from the North Country (featuring music by Bob Dylan) opposite Luba Mason and Mare Winningham The Tony Award winning limited engagement played its final  performance June 19, 2022.

Filmography and stage work

Film

Television

Stage

Awards and recognition
 Shorty Award for Humor (Nominee) (2014)
 100 Most Creative People in Entertainment "It" List, 2003 Entertainment Weekly
 Sexiest Broadway Star - People (2000)
 Theatre World Award (Winner) (2000)
 Broadway.com Audience Awards (Winner) (2000)
 Tony Award for Best Actor in a Musical for The Music Man (Nominee) (2000)
 Drama Desk Award for Best Actor in a Musical for The Music Man  (Nominee) (2000)
 Outer Critics Circle Award for Best Actor in a Musical for The Music Man  (Nominee)  (2000)

References

External links
 
 
 
 
 

1964 births
Living people
Jewish American male actors
Jewish singers
Male actors from New York (state)
American male film actors
American people of Polish descent
American male musical theatre actors
American male television actors
Boston University College of Communication alumni
Northwestern University School of Communication alumni
People from Rye Brook, New York
20th-century American male actors
21st-century American male actors
Theatre World Award winners
21st-century American Jews